Frank Lippmann (born 23 April 1961) is a German former footballer who played as a forward. He defected from East Germany to West Germany after playing for Dynamo Dresden against Bayer Uerdingen in a 1986 UEFA Cup match.

References

External links

1961 births
Living people
People from Bezirk Dresden
Footballers from Dresden
German footballers
East German footballers
East German defectors
Association football forwards
Bundesliga players
DDR-Oberliga players
Dynamo Dresden players
1. FC Nürnberg players
SV Waldhof Mannheim players
LASK players
SK Vorwärts Steyr players
Dresdner SC players
Dynamo Dresden non-playing staff
East German emigrants to West Germany
German expatriate footballers
German expatriate sportspeople in Austria
Expatriate footballers in Austria
German expatriate sportspeople in Switzerland
Expatriate footballers in Switzerland